Kulada (Kuladı) is a rural locality (a selo) and the administrative centre of Kuladinskoye Rural Settlement of Ongudaysky District, the Altai Republic, Russia. The population was 467 as of 2016. There are 11 streets.

Geography 
Kulada is located 37 km southwest of Onguday (the district's administrative centre) by road. Boochi is the nearest rural locality.

References 

Rural localities in Ongudaysky District